Tyson Pedro (born 17 September 1991) is an Australian mixed martial artist who competes in the Light heavyweight division of the Ultimate Fighting Championship (UFC).

Background 
Pedro is an Australian of Spanish, American Samoa heritage.

He is the son of John Pedro, who owned King of the Cage in Australia and was one of exponent MMA and fighters fought in the first cage fight in Australia. With seven black belts of different combat sport style, Pedro was introduced to Japanese jiu-jitsu at the age of 4. From jujutsu, he progressed to boxing and Brazilian jiu-jitsu before eventually fighting MMA.

Mixed martial arts career 
After winning over Kiwi Steven Warby at Australian Fighting Championship 17 via rear-naked choke, Pedro called UFC president Dana White and personally asked him to fight at UFC Fight Night: Whittaker vs. Brunson in Melbourne, should any fighters pull out from the event. He was added to the card after Luke Rockhold withdrew from the event due to a sprained anterior cruciate ligament.

Ultimate Fighting Championship
Pedro made his promotional debut against Khalil Rountree on November 15, 2016, at UFC Fight Night: Whittaker vs. Brunson. He won the fight via submission in round 1, for which he was awarded a Performance of the Night bonus.

Pedro faced Paul Craig on March 4, 2017, at UFC 209. He won the fight via first round TKO.

Pedro fought Ilir Latifi on September 9, 2017, at UFC 215. Latifi won the fight via unanimous decision, handing Pedro his first professional loss.

Pedro faced Saparbek Safarov on February 11, 2018, at UFC 221. He won the fight via submission due to a kimura in the first round.

Pedro faced Ovince Saint Preux on  June 23, 2018, at UFC Fight Night: Cowboy vs. Edwards. He lost the fight via submission in the first round.

On August 10, 2018, it was revealed that Pedro had signed a new, six-fight contract with the UFC.

Pedro faced Maurício Rua on December 2, 2018, at UFC Fight Night 142. Rua defeated Pedro via technical knockout in round three, finishing Pedro after he suffered a leg injury and was unable to defend himself.

Pedro was sidelined for all of 2019 as he recovered from knee reconstruction surgery.

Pedro was scheduled to face Vinicius Moreira on February 23, 2020, at UFC Fight Night: Felder vs. Hooker. However, Pedro pulled out of the fight in early January citing an undisclosed injury.

After a three year absence from fighting, Pedro returned to face Ike Villanueva on April 23, 2022, at UFC Fight Night 205. He won the fight via knockout in the first round.

Pedro faced Harry Hunsucker on August 20, 2022 at UFC 278 . He won the fight after stopping Hunsucker with a front kick to the body and ground and pound.

Pedro was scheduled to face Zhang Mingyang on February 12, 2023 at UFC 284. However, Mingyang withdrew for unknown reasons and was replaced by Modestas Bukauskas. He lost the fight via unanimous decision.

Personal life 
Pedro is married. His father, John Pedro, is famous for bringing MMA to Australia.

Pedro's brother-in-law is UFC heavyweight fighter Tai Tuivasa.

Pedro is a fan of the Penrith Panthers, a professional Rugby league team in Australia.

As of December 2017, Pedro hosted "The Halfcast Podcast" with Tai Tuivasa as co-host.

He is named after former undisputed heavyweight boxing champion Mike Tyson.

Championships and accomplishments

Mixed martial arts 
Ultimate Fighting Championship
Performance of the Night (One time)

Mixed martial arts record 

|-
|Loss
|align=center|9–4
|Modestas Bukauskas
|Decision (unanimous)
|UFC 284
|
|align=center|3
|align=center|5:00
|Perth, Australia 
|
|-
|Win
|align=center|9–3
|Harry Hunsucker
|TKO (body kick and punches)
|UFC 278
|
|align=center|1
|align=center|1:05
|Salt Lake City, Utah, United States
|
|-
|Win
|align=center|8–3
|Ike Villanueva
|KO (leg kick and punches)
|UFC Fight Night: Lemos vs. Andrade
|
|align=center|1
|align=center|4:55
|Las Vegas, Nevada, United States
|
|-
|Loss
|align=center|7–3
|Maurício Rua
|TKO (punches)
|UFC Fight Night: dos Santos vs. Tuivasa
|
|align=center|3
|align=center|0:43
|Adelaide, Australia
|
|-
|Loss
|align=center|7–2
|Ovince Saint Preux
|Submission (straight armbar)
|UFC Fight Night: Cowboy vs. Edwards
|
|align=center|1
|align=center|2:54
|Kallang, Singapore
|
|-
|Win
|align=center|7–1
|Saparbek Safarov
|Submission (kimura)
|UFC 221
|
|align=center|1
|align=center|3:54
|Perth, Australia
|
|-
|Loss
|align=center|6–1
|Ilir Latifi
|Decision (unanimous)
|UFC 215
|
|align=center|3
|align=center|5:00
|Edmonton, Alberta, Canada
|
|-
| Win
| align=center| 6–0
| Paul Craig
| TKO (elbows)
| UFC 209
| 
| align=center| 1
| align=center| 4:10
| Las Vegas, Nevada, United States
|
|-
| Win
| align=center| 5–0
| Khalil Rountree Jr.
| Submission (rear-naked choke)
| UFC Fight Night: Whittaker vs. Brunson
| 
| align=center| 1
| align=center| 4:07
| Melbourne, Australia
| 
|-
| Win
| align=center| 4–0
| Stephen Warby
| Submission (rear-naked choke)
| Australian FC 17
| 
| align=center| 1
| align=center| 3:05
| Melbourne, Australia
|
|-
| Win
| align=center| 3–0
| Don Endermann
| Submission (rear-naked choke)
| Australian FC 16
| 
| align=center| 1
| align=center| 2:27
| Melbourne, Australia
|
|-
| Win
| align=center| 2–0
| Michael Fitzgerald
| Submission (guillotine choke)
| Urban Fight Night 6
| 
| align=center| 1
| align=center| 2:20
| Sydney, Australia
|
|-
| Win
| align=center| 1–0
| Charlie Ngaheu
| KO (punch)
| Eternal MMA 3
| 
| align=center| 1
| align=center| 0:31
| Gold Coast, Australia
|
|-
|}

See also 

 List of current UFC fighters
 List of male mixed martial artists

References

External links 
 
 

1991 births
Living people
Sportspeople from Sydney
Sportsmen from New South Wales
Australian sportspeople of Samoan descent
Light heavyweight mixed martial artists
Australian male mixed martial artists
Australian people of Italian descent
Australian people of Spanish descent
Samoan male mixed martial artists
Mixed martial artists utilizing jujutsu
Mixed martial artists utilizing American Kenpo
Mixed martial artists utilizing Brazilian jiu-jitsu
Australian practitioners of Brazilian jiu-jitsu
Samoan practitioners of Brazilian jiu-jitsu
People awarded a black belt in Brazilian jiu-jitsu
Australian jujutsuka
Samoan jujutsuka
Ultimate Fighting Championship male fighters